ULAQ  is the prototype of the first Turkish armed unmanned surface vessel (AUSV).

Background
The design studies completed by August 2020, and the prototype was launched on 12 February 2021 in Antalya. It was planned that firing tests with guided missiles of Roketsan would be carried out by March 2021. On 25 May 2021, the vessel successfully completed its first firing test. The Roketsan Cirit missile fired from the vessel destroyed the target with pinpoint accuracy.

Characteristics
The vessel can be deployed from combat ships. She can be controlled remotely from mobile vehicles, headquarters, command centers and floating platforms. It serves in missions such as reconnaissance, surveillance and intelligence, surface warfare, asymmetric warfare, armed escort and force protection, and strategic facility security. It is planned that the vessel will operate jointly with other AUSVs, armed UAVs and aircraft, and instantly transmit images and other data she obtains to provide major benefits to the operational capability of the Turkish Armed Forces.

The ULAQ AUSV will come in 6 different variants each with its own type of mission and armament

She is operable at rough sea (sea state 5:  wave height). She has indigenous encrypted communications and day/night vision capabilities. She is resistant to electronic warfare and is equipped with an Anti GPS jammer device.

Armament: 
ULAQ Surface Combat: 4x L-UMTAS missiles or 2x L-UMTAS & 2x CIRIT missile. 

ULAQ anti-ship: 4x ATMACA anti-ship missiles 

ULAQ ISR & EW (Intelligence, Surveillance and Reconnaissance / Electronical Warfare): Unarmed

ULAQ ASW (Anti-Submarine Warfare): 2x ORKA Lightweight torpedo + 12 sonobuoy

ULAQ FiFi (Firefighting vehicle):

ULAQ MCMV (Mine Counter-Measures Vessel):

ULAQ bears similarities to the Fleet-class common USV of Textron Systems, USA and the Protector USV of Rafael Advanced Defense Systems, Israel.

References 

2021 ships
Ships built in Antalya
Naval ships of Turkey
Unmanned surface vehicles